FC Energetik Uren was a Russian football team from Uren. It played professionally from 1996 to 2006 and in 2008. Their best result was 4th place in Zone Povolzhye of the Russian Second Division in 1998, 1999, 2001 and 2002.

Team name history
 1992–1997: FC Energetik Uren
 1998: FC Energiya Uren
 1999–2008: FC Energetik Uren

External links
  Team history at KLISF

Association football clubs established in 1992
Association football clubs disestablished in 2009
Defunct football clubs in Russia
Sport in Nizhny Novgorod Oblast
1992 establishments in Russia
2009 disestablishments in Russia